The Last Night of the Barbary Coast (1913) was an early example of the exploitation film, showing what was purported to be the last night of the Barbary Coast red-light section of San Francisco. In reality, the Barbary Coast wasn't shut down until 1917.

The film, directed by Hal Mohr and Sol Lesser, is now considered a lost film. Mohr (a native of San Francisco himself), later an Academy Award winner, did the cinematography, and Lesser went on to become a Hollywood producer.

See also
List of lost films

References

External links
The Last Night of the Barbary Coast at IMDB
The Last Night of the Barbary Coast at SilentEra

1913 films
Barbary Coast, San Francisco
Films set in San Francisco
Films shot in San Francisco
Lost American films
American black-and-white films
American silent short films
1913 lost films
1910s American films